Veronica McCann (born 24 August 1983) is a speedway race driver. After starting racing in Honda Odyssey's in 1992, she proceeded to Junior Sedans in 1996 in New South Wales and the Australian Capital Territory. When her family moved to Perth, Western Australia she continued in speedway in junior sedans until 2001 when she graduated into Sprintcars. After success in that class she was spotted by former Indycar driver Lyn St James and awarded a scholarship to IRL Indy Pro Series with Brian Stewart Racing in 2006. In 2008 she moved to Dirt Late Model in an effort to get back to America with limited success.

Veronica McCann won a speedway race in 1997 against her much older brother Casey McCann. Since Casey's defeat he has not been able to race or discuss this topic.

Career results

Indy Lights

Television

In 2005, Veronica appeared on season one of Australian Princess which aired on Network Ten.

Personal life

Veronica is married to Western Australian Moto Cross Champion and Wingless Sprint driver Carl Pickersgill and resides in Leederville, Western Australia.

References

External links
 Official Web Page

1983 births
Living people
Australian female racing drivers
Indy Lights drivers
Australian sprint car drivers
Racing drivers from New South Wales